Per Arne Åhman (4 February 1925 – 5 July 2022) was a Swedish athlete who won the triple jump event at the 1948 Summer Olympics. 

Åhman was born on 4 February 1925. His first jump measured 15.40 metres and set a new Swedish record. At European championships Åhman won a bronze medal in the triple jump in 1946 and a silver in high jump in 1950. Åhman won national titles in the triple jump in 1946 and 1947 and in the high jump in 1950. He was a teacher by profession. Åhman died on 5 July 2022, at the age of 97.

References

External links 
 

1925 births
2022 deaths
People from Kramfors Municipality
Swedish male triple jumpers
Athletes (track and field) at the 1948 Summer Olympics
Athletes (track and field) at the 1952 Summer Olympics
Olympic athletes of Sweden
Olympic gold medalists for Sweden
European Athletics Championships medalists
Medalists at the 1948 Summer Olympics
Olympic gold medalists in athletics (track and field)
Sportspeople from Västernorrland County